Kirsten McCann (born 25 August 1988) is a South African competitive rower.

She competed at the 2016 Summer Olympics in Rio de Janeiro, in the women's lightweight double sculls. She and teammate Ursula Grobler finished in 5th place. At the 2017 World Rowing Championships, she won gold in the women's lightweight single sculls.

References

External links

1988 births
Living people
South African female rowers
Olympic rowers of South Africa
Rowers at the 2008 Summer Olympics
Rowers at the 2016 Summer Olympics
World Rowing Championships medalists for South Africa